This is a list of the tallest buildings in Katowice, in descending order.

Tallest buildings

Under construction

Proposed

See also
List of tallest buildings in Poland

References

Katowice